Mariner was a canceled project to add performance and stability enhancements to the browser engine used in the Netscape Communicator web browser. Mariner became open source in March 1998 when Netscape released its client code and started the Mozilla project.

Mariner added support for page reflow, a feature lacking in previous Netscape releases, making the layout of text and tables much faster. In addition, development work was done on a Document Object Model (level 1) and stability was improved. Enhancements to HTML and CSS were also made but these were not technically part of the Mariner project.

The original intention was to ship Mariner in Netscape Communicator 5.0, with subsequent releases using the newer NGLayout engine (now called Gecko). However, in October 1998, Netscape decided to abandon the old layout engine in favour of NGLayout and work on Mariner ceased. Netscape Communicator 5.0 and Mariner never shipped. The next major Netscape revision (Netscape 6, released in November 2000) was built around Gecko.

External links
 Mariner Project Page (no longer updated)

Layout engines
Mozilla
Netscape